Catasetum socco is a species of orchid found in south-eastern Brazil.

References

External links

socco
Orchids of Brazil